Jean Kembo Uba-Kembo (27 December 1947 – 26 March 2007) was a Congolese football midfielder who played for Zaire in the 1974 FIFA World Cup.

Career
Born in Matete, Kembo played club football for AS Vita Club, where he would win the African Cup of Champions Clubs.

He made several appearances for Zaire, including appearances at the 1968 and 1974 African Cup of Nations finals. Kembo scored two goals in the decisive qualifier versus Morocco in a 3-0 win that clinched Zaire's place in the 1974 World Cup.

Personal life
Kembo's son, Jirès Kembo Ekoko, is a professional footballer who played for Stade Rennais F.C.

References

External links
FIFA profile

1947 births
2007 deaths
Footballers from Kinshasa
Africa Cup of Nations-winning players
Democratic Republic of the Congo footballers
Democratic Republic of the Congo international footballers
Association football midfielders
AS Vita Club players
1974 FIFA World Cup players
1968 African Cup of Nations players
1970 African Cup of Nations players
1974 African Cup of Nations players
1976 African Cup of Nations players
21st-century Democratic Republic of the Congo people